The Millennium Hotel St. Louis, more commonly known simply as the Millennium Hotel, is a defunct hotel complex in downtown St. Louis, Missouri that closed in 2014. The lower complex consisted of a plaza and several recreational facilities. Two towers, Millennium Hotel Tower I and Millennium Hotel Tower II, made up the hotel space. Tower I is 28 stories tall and was constructed in 1968. Tower II is 11 stories tall and was constructed in 1974. The building is adjacent to the Gateway Arch. The hotel had 780 rooms and 19 suites. It also featured a revolving restaurant called "Top of the Riverfront" on the 28th floor of Tower I.

History
The Millennium Hotel was originally known as Stouffer's Riverfront Inn and later as the Regal Riverfront Hotel until it was acquired by Millennium Hotels and Resorts in 1999. For many years it was also known as The Clarion Hotel. It was designed by Tiernan Design and built by William B. Tabler Architects. Prior to closing the hotel's general manager was Robert Rivers. It closed in January 2014.

As of March, 2023, no work has yet taken place to renovate or reopen the hotel.

References

Skyscrapers in St. Louis
Hotels in St. Louis
Hotels established in 1968
Hotel buildings completed in 1968
Buildings and structures with revolving restaurants
Skyscraper hotels in Missouri
Downtown St. Louis
Buildings and structures in St. Louis
1968 establishments in Missouri
Defunct hotels in the United States